The 1916 Montana football team represented the University of Montana in the 1916 college football season. They were led by second-year head coach Jerry Nissen, played their home games at Dornblaser Field and finished the season 

The Spokesman-Review (of Spokane, Washington) referred to the team as the "Grizzlies" in its November 19 edition.

Schedule

References

Montana
Montana Grizzlies football seasons
Montana football